Zuidwolde may refer to:

Zuidwolde, Drenthe
Zuidwolde, Groningen